The 1991 Tampa Bay Buccaneers season was the franchise's 16th season in the National Football League.

In Richard Williamson's first full season as coach the Buccaneers started by losing their first five games, on the way to another last place 3–13 season. Among the major disappointments was quarterback Vinny Testaverde, who was replaced by Chris Chandler at quarterback early in the season, who passed for 1,994 yards and eight touchdown passes to 15 interceptions. Following the season Coach Williamson would be fired and replaced by Sam Wyche.

Tax records would later show that the Buccaneers were one of the most profitable teams during this time, even though owner Hugh Culverhouse announced the Bucs were losing money and needed to play games in Orlando, Florida to get income. Such records revealed Culverhouse ran the Bucs as a profit first business, often releasing better players who would deserve big contracts.

Offseason

NFL Draft

Personnel

Staff

Roster

Regular season

Schedule

Season summary

Week 6

Standings

References

External links
 1991 Tampa Bay Buccaneers at Pro-Football-Reference.com

Tampa Bay Buccaneers season
Tampa Bay Buccaneers
20th century in Tampa, Florida
Tampa Bay Buccaneers seasons